Basiprionota is a genus of beetle belonging to the family Chrysomelidae.

Species 
The following species are accepted within Basiprionota:

 Basiprionota amboinica (Spaeth, 1925) 
 Basiprionota amitina (Spaeth, 1932)    
 Basiprionota andrewesi (Weise, 1897)    
 Basiprionota angusta (Spaeth, 1914)    
 Basiprionota animosa (Spaeth, 1926)    
 Basiprionota atricornis (Spaeth, 1912)    
 Basiprionota bakeri (Spaeth, 1925)    
 Basiprionota bimaculata (Thunberg, 1789)    
 Basiprionota bisignata (Boheman, 1862)    
 Basiprionota ceramensis (Spaeth, 1925)    
 Basiprionota cerata (Spaeth, 1925)    
 Basiprionota chinensis (Fabricius, 1798)    
 Basiprionota decemmaculata (Boheman, 1850)    
 Basiprionota decempustulata (Boheman, 1850)    
 Basiprionota decemstillata (Boheman, 1856)    
 Basiprionota encausta (Spaeth, 1925)    
 Basiprionota flavicornis Borowiec, 1993    
 Basiprionota gibbifera (Spaeth, 1925)    
 Basiprionota gibbosa (Baly, 1863)    
 Basiprionota gressitti Medvedev, 1957    
 Basiprionota immaculata (Wagener, 1881)    
 Basiprionota impacata (Spaeth, 1925)    
 Basiprionota joloana (Spaeth, 1925)    
 Basiprionota laotica (Spaeth, 1933)    
 Basiprionota lata Chen and Zia, 1964    
 Basiprionota latissima (Wagener, 1881)    
 Basiprionota lomholdti Borowiec, 1991    
 Basiprionota maerkeli (Boheman, 1850)    
 Basiprionota morigera (Spaeth, 1925)    
 Basiprionota multiplagiata (Wagener, 1881)    
 Basiprionota multipunctata (Gressitt, 1938)    
 Basiprionota nigricollis (Weise, 1897)    
 Basiprionota octomaculata (Boheman, 1850)    
 Basiprionota octonotata (Fabricius, 1787)    
 Basiprionota octopunctata (Fabricius, 1787)    
 Basiprionota octopustulata (Boheman, 1856)    
 Basiprionota omeia Chen and Zia, 1964    
 Basiprionota opima (Spaeth, 1925)    
 Basiprionota palawanica (Weise, 1913)    
 Basiprionota patkoiensis (Spaeth, 1926)    
 Basiprionota privigna (Boheman, 1862)    
 Basiprionota prognata (Spaeth, 1925)    
 Basiprionota pudica (Spaeth, 1925)    
 Basiprionota puellaris (Spaeth, 1925)    
 Basiprionota quadriimpresa (Boheman, 1850)    
 Basiprionota ramigera (Boheman, 1862)    
 Basiprionota rugosipennis (Spaeth, 1901)    
 Basiprionota sarawacensis (Spaeth, 1912)    
 Basiprionota scheerpeltzi (Spaeth, 1925)    
 Basiprionota schultzei (Weise, 1908)    
 Basiprionota secreta (Spaeth, 1925)    
 Basiprionota sexmaculata (Boheman, 1850)    
 Basiprionota sinuata (Olivier, 1790)    
 Basiprionota sospes (Spaeth, 1925)    
 Basiprionota subopaca (Spaeth, 1925)    
 Basiprionota sulana (Spaeth, 1925)    
 Basiprionota sumatrana (Weise, 1912)    
 Basiprionota sumba Borowiec, 2006    
 Basiprionota tibetana (Spaeth, 1914)    
 Basiprionota timorensis (Spaeth, 1925)    
 Basiprionota trux (Spaeth, 1925)    
 Basiprionota vicina (Spaeth, 1925)    
 Basiprionota westermanni (Mannerheim, 1844)    
 Basiprionota whitei (Boheman, 1856)

References

Cassidinae
Beetles described in 1836